Tessa Price (born March 25, 1967) is a retired professional tennis player from South Africa. She participated in four Grand Slams during her career, reaching the second round at the Australian Open in 1993, and at Wimbledon in 1994.

ITF Circuit finals

Singles (9–3)

Doubles (8–3)

References

External links
 
 

1967 births
Living people
Sportspeople from Cape Town
South African female tennis players
White South African people